The 2006 BWF World Junior Championships is the eight tournament of the BWF World Junior Championships. It was held in Incheon, South Korea at the Samsan World Gymnasium, between 2–11 November 2006.

Medalists

Team competition
A total of 28 countries competed at the team competition in 2006 BWF World Junior Championships.

Final positions

South Korea
China
Malaysia
Indonesia
Japan
Singapore
Thailand
India
Chinese Taipei
England
Germany
Russia
Denmark
Netherlands
Czech Republic
Turkey
Hong Kong
Ukraine
Vietnam
United States
Canada
Bulgaria
New Zealand
Australia
Philippines
Pakistan
South Africa
Egypt

Final Round

Individual competitions

Boys Singles

Seeded

Kenichi Tago (quarter-final)
Han Ki-Hoon (quarter-final)
Mohd Arif Abdul Latif (fourth round)
Tommy Sugiarto (final)
Chen Tianyu (third round)
Lu Qicheng (semi-final)
Teo Kok Siang (third round)
Derek Wong Zi Liang (fourth round)
Mads Conrad-Petersen (fourth round)
Hong Ji-Hoon (champion)
Wen Kai (second round)
Lim Fang Yang (fourth round)
Naohiro Matsukawa (quarter-final)
Lester Oey (second round)
Jeff Tho (third round)
Wong Shu Ki (second round)

Finals

Girls Singles

Seeded

Wang Yihan (champion)
Lydia Cheah Li Ya (fourth round)
Han Li (quarter-final)
Liu Jie (quarter-final)
Pia Zebadiah (quarter-final)
Cheng Wen (quarter-final)
Jang Soo-Young (fourth round)
Kim Moon-Hi (semi-final)
Porntip Buranaprasertsuk (fourth round)
Michelle Cheung (second round)
Vivian Hoo Kah Mun (fourth round)
Hung Shih-Han (third round)
Karina Jørgensen (third round)
Saina Nehwal (final)
Tee Jing Yi (third round)
Xing Aiying (third round)

Finals

Boys Doubles

Seeded

Lee Yong-Dae / Cho Gun-Woo (champion)
Mohd Razif Abdul Latif / Vountus Indra Mawan (quarter-final)
Mads Pieler Kolding / Mads Conrad-Petersen (third round)
Lim Khim Wah / Mak Hee Chun (semi-final)
Fernando Kurniawan / Subakti (third round)
Jishnu Sanyal / Akshay Dewalkar (quarter-final)
Henry Tam / Kevin Dennerly-Minturn (second round)
Derek Wong Zi Liang / Jonathan Tang Yew Loong (third round)

Finals

Girls Doubles

Seeded

Ma Jin / Wang Xiaoli (champion)
Wang Siyun / Liao Jingmei (semi-final)
Lily Siswanti / Richi Puspita Dili (second round)
Hsieh Pei-Chen / Lee Tai-An (quarter-final)
Danielle Barry / Emma Rodgers (second round)
Chanida Julrattanamanee / Kittitharakul Ancheera (third round)
Erica Pong / Victoria Na (second round)
Gabrielle White / Mariana Agathangelou (third round)

Finals

Mixed doubles

Seeded

Lee Yong-Dae / Yoo Hyun-Young (champion)
Tan Wee Kiong / Woon Khe Wei (fourth round)
Hu Wenqing / Wang Xiaoli (semi-final)
Liu Xiaolong / Liao Jingmei (semi-final)
Boris Ma / Victoria Na (third round)
Kevin Dennerly-Minturn / Emma Rodgers (third round)
Mads Pieler Kolding / Line Damkjaer Kruse (quarter-final)
Viki Indra Okvana / Richi Puspita Dili (quarter-final)
Cho Gun-Woo / Hong Soo-Jung (third round)
Chris Adcock / Gabrielle White (fourth round)
Emmanuel Pun / Lauren Todt (second round)
Gordey Kosenko / Victoria Yushkova (second round)
Henry Tam / Danielle Barry (third round)
Illian Krastev / Dimitria Popstoikova (second round)
Mohd Lutfi Zaim Abdul Khalid / Goh Liu Ying (fourth round)
Wong Shu Ki / Chan Tsz Ka (second round)

Finals

Medal table

References

 
BWF World Junior Championships
World Junior Championships
2006 Bwf World Junior Championships
2006 Bwf World Junior Championships
2006 Bwf World Junior Championships
2006 in South Korean sport
2006 in youth sport